Mordellistena cypria is a species of beetle in the genus Mordellistena of the family Mordellidae. It was discovered in 1963 and is endemic to Cyprus.

References

cypria
Beetles described in 1963
Endemic arthropods of Cyprus
Beetles of Europe